Omar Sabino de Paula (25 July 1932 – 22 July 2011) was a Brazilian lawyer and politician. He served as the Vice Governor of Acre from 1975 to 1979.

References 

1932 births
2011 deaths
People from Manoel Urbano
Vice Governors of Acre (state)
Progressistas politicians
Democratic Social Party politicians
National Renewal Alliance politicians